Yoshi is a fictional dinosaur who appears in video games published by Nintendo. Yoshi debuted in Super Mario World (1990) on the Super Nintendo Entertainment System as Mario and Luigi's sidekick. Throughout the mainline Mario series, Yoshi typically serves as Mario’s trusted steed. With a gluttonous appetite, Yoshi can gobble enemies with his elastic tongue, and lay eggs that doubly function as projectiles. Yoshi is the title character of the Yoshi series and a supporting character in Mario spin-off games such as Mario Party and Mario Kart, as well as many Mario sports games. He also appears as a playable character in the crossover fighting game series Super Smash Bros. Yoshi is a member of the same-named species, which is distinguished for its wide range of colors.

Yoshi was well-received, with some critics noting that he is one of the most recognizable characters and one of the best sidekicks in video games. Yoshi's image has also appeared on a range of products, including clothes and collectibles.

Concept and creation 

Shigeru Miyamoto, the video game designer at Nintendo credited with inventing the Mario series, had wanted Mario to have a dinosaur companion ever since the first release of Super Mario Bros.; however, Nintendo engineers could not add such a character into the game due to the limitations of the Nintendo Entertainment System (NES). The inspiration for Yoshi can be traced back further, to the green dragon Tamagon in the 1984 video game Devil World: also designed by Miyamoto, both are green lizards that hatch from eggs and can eat enemies with their large mouth, and also emit the same noise when they hatch. During the development of Super Mario Bros. 3, Miyamoto had a number of sketches around his desk, including an image of Mario riding a horse. Takashi Tezuka, a Mario series developer, speculated that Miyamoto's love of horse riding as well as country and western themes influenced Yoshi's creation. The concept of Mario riding a dinosaur also came from the NES video game Excitebike, which featured people riding motorcycles.

Once the more powerful Super NES was released, Miyamoto was finally able to implement Yoshi into the series, putting Yoshi into the video game Super Mario World. As development of Super Mario World progressed, the team opted to set the game in a "dinosaur land", so Tezuka asked designer Shigefumi Hino to draw a reptile-like creature based on Miyamoto's sketches. Hino originally produced a design that Tezuka deemed too reptilian, and "didn't really fit into the Mario world", so he encouraged the designer to create a "cuter" character. According to Hino also, the reasoning behind the design is that when Mario punches Yoshi, Yoshi is so surprised that his tongue leaps out.

Yoshi proved to be popular in this debut, which caused the next game in the series, Super Mario World 2: Yoshi's Island, to focus on the Yoshi species. Miyamoto made the idea of using Yoshi as the main character of a platforming game, with the goal of being more accessible than previous games in the Mario series. To give the gameplay a more "gentle and relaxed pacing", the levels lack time limits and feature more exploration elements than previous games; Yoshi's flutter jump also makes him easier to control in the air than Mario. In this game, he is responsible for Baby Mario, which leads him to Bowser's Castle, where he is reunited with Baby Luigi. Yoshi successfully pulls the twins together just in time to go home after beating a huge Baby Bowser.

The version of Yoshi seen in the Super Mario Bros. film was made using a  animatronic dinosaur. Yoshi was designed in the film by Dave Nelson. The animatronic had nearly 60 meters (200 ft) of cable and hundreds of moving parts inside of it and was controlled by nine puppeteers. The body was cable-controlled, while the head was radio-controlled. Nelson described the overall process as being "difficult." The creation of Yoshi was handled by a company independent from the filmmakers. Yoshi also belongs to the species of the same name, which is characterized by their variety of colors.

Characteristics 
Yoshi has a variety of abilities that stand out relative to other characters in the Mario series. Yoshi's prehensile tongue can extend a considerable distance to eat enemies, grab distant objects, or act as a grappling hook to access otherwise out-of-reach areas. After eating an enemy or object, Yoshi may either spit it out as an attack, or swallow it to instantly turn it into a distinctive spotted egg; eggs can then be thrown at distant targets to collect or damage them, and depending on the game they either explode on impact or ricochet off surfaces. Another signature technique is the Flutter Jump, where Yoshi quickly flaps his arms and legs to slow his descent from a jump or even gain height in midair. Yoshi is also a noted user of the Ground Pound, which involves dropping bottom-first after a jump in order to destroy blocks or damage opponents. Yoshi's large nose unsurprisingly allows for the detection of hidden collectibles as well as flowers by smell and, as demonstrated in the Super Smash Bros. series, may be used as an offensive weapon. Yoshi can form an egg around himself, which can be used for protection as a shield against attacks or for mobility by rolling or launching himself. Yoshi's Final Smash in installments before Super Smash Bros. Ultimate had him grow wings and be able to breathe fire for a limited period of time. His newest Final Smash has his opponent trampled under a stampede of Yoshis.

The Yoshi species appear in a variety of colors. This is generally a cosmetic difference used to differentiate individuals. However, in some games, Yoshi's color changes to reflect gained offensive or movement abilities, such as fiery breath, wings, balloon-like inflation, or juice-spitting. In some games, this is a characteristic of Yoshi's natural color, while in others it is a temporary status gained by eating certain fruit or flowers. Yoshis of various colors appear often in multiplayer games as alternate choices, which may or may not have statistics unique from the default green color.

In games where the player can ride Yoshi, he acts as an extra hit point; taking damage causes the player to be knocked off Yoshi instead of any other negative effects. This causes Yoshi to run around haphazardly until he is remounted, falls off-screen, or disappears in some 3D games. Yoshi is otherwise indestructible; he can freely walk over spikes, does more damage to enemies when jumped on, and can take any number of hits without additional penalty. Combined with his other unique powers, this makes him very strong in levels designed for Mario's abilities, while a level designed for Yoshi may be overly difficult for Mario alone. As a result, Yoshi's presence tends to be limited to certain levels; for example, in Super Mario World he is not allowed in haunted or castle levels (explained in-universe by him being scared of such areas). While riding Yoshi, bongos or other thematically appropriate percussion instruments are added to the level's background music.

Yoshi's language skills are inconsistent. In some games, they speak the same language as all other characters. In others, they are shown with their speech in parentheses to imply speaking a different language that is translated for the player to read. Sometimes they are shown only speaking the repeated word "Yoshi". Whether other characters can understand Yoshi's speech is also inconsistent.

Appearances

In Super Mario series

Super Mario World was the first video game to feature Yoshi as a companion to Mario. Yoshi's rideability was inspired by Miyamoto's love for horseback riding. Super Mario World released during a console war between Nintendo and Sega; Sega's mascot, Sonic the Hedgehog, was considered a "cooler" alternative to Mario, for which Miyamoto apologized.

In Super Mario 64, Yoshi makes a minor cameo. A cannon outside the castle becomes available if Mario collects all 120 Power Stars, which can be used to access the Mushroom Castle's roof. There, the player can chat with Yoshi, who congratulates the player on finishing the game by delivering a message from the developers before rewarding Mario with 100 extra lives and a better Triple Jump.

Yoshi is one of the primary protagonists and the first playable character in Super Mario 64 DS, alongside Mario. Princess Peach initially invites Mario to her palace. Yoshi is sleeping on the roof when Mario, Luigi, and Wario arrive at the castle. During this time, Bowser kidnaps Princess Peach, steals the castle's Power Stars, and confines everyone within by placing them in the worlds inside the castle's paintings. The crew reclaims the castle's Power Stars after Yoshi saves Mario, Mario saves Luigi, and Luigi saves Wario, and Mario defeats Bowser and rescues Princess Peach.

In Super Mario Sunshine, Yoshi appears as a mount for Mario, and will only come out of his egg if offered a specific tropical fruit. This fruit gives him the ability to spit a finite stream of juice, though with the tradeoff that he dies as soon as he touches water.

Yoshi makes another cameo in New Super Mario Bros. Wii and New Super Mario Bros. U, this time as a rideable character, as he did in his initial appearance. Yoshi sounds just like he does in Super Mario World. Yoshi's in the colors yellow, light blue, and pink also appear in multiplayer.

Yoshi's appearance is a prominent selling point for Super Mario Galaxy 2, as his gained abilities while eating various fruits aid Mario and Luigi in gathering power stars to foil Bowser's plan to take over the universe. These fruits give him the ability to float, to run on water and against gravity, and to illuminate intangible walkways.

Yoshi and his eggs can be found in Super Mario Maker and Super Mario Maker 2 in the Super Mario World and New Super Mario Bros. U styles, and they function the same as they do in each respective game.

Yoshi appears in Super Mario Odyssey as a capturable character. In the Mushroom Kingdom, he may be found on top of Peach's Castle, just like in Super Mario 64. He can also be discovered in Yoshi Eggs in secret locations accessed via the Dark Side, where he must eat Berries in order for a Power Moon to form. He can also be found in one of the Darker Side's sections. Yoshi may employ his characteristic Flutter Jump and eating powers if captured, similar to his appearance in Super Mario Galaxy 2.

In Yoshi series

Yoshi's initial appearance in the Yoshi series was in the puzzle game named after him, where he counted the number of eggs hatched on the side of the screen.

In Yoshi's Cookie, Yoshi appears as a character in V.S. mode. Yoshi has to make horizontal and vertical rows of the same kind of cookie to proceed to the next level. In the Nintendo Puzzle Collection version, there is now a story mode in the game, where Mario and Yoshi are making cookies but get exhausted from the many cookie deliveries.

Bowser conquers Jewelry Land during the events of Yoshi's Safari (It is the only Mario franchise game to feature first-person shooter gameplay and requires the SNES's Super Scope light gun.), kidnapping its rulers, King Fret and Prince Pine, and removing the twelve mystical jewels that gave the kingdom its name and stability, forcing it to split into two realms: the Dark Realm and the Light Realm. Princess Peach then summons Mario and Yoshi to restore order. To help the two, Peach provides Mario a new weapon, the Super Scope, an energy pistol. Mario and Yoshi enter a Warp Pipe with this new weapon, which transports them to Jewelry Land.

The Magikoopa sorcerer Kamek foresees that two newborn brothers will bring ruin to the Koopas and attempts to capture them as the stork carries them to their mother and father in the Mushroom Kingdom one morning years before the events of most Mario games, during the events of Super Mario World 2: Yoshi's Island. While Kamek captures Baby Luigi, his twin brother, Baby Mario, escapes to Yoshi's Island unseen. Fortunately, Yoshi is out walking in the woods that day, and Baby Mario lands unharmed on his saddle, along with a map to Bowser's Castle, where Kamek has stolen Baby Luigi.

Baby Mario was entirely absent in the next Yoshi game, Yoshi’s Story, in which Baby Bowser steals a tree that is the source of the Yoshis’ happiness, and turns their world into a picture book. Six eggs survive, and hatch into baby Yoshis, the protagonists.

Bowser and his forces attack Yoshi's Island during the events of Yoshi Topsy-Turvy (also known as Yoshi's Universal Gravitation), bringing chaos and anarchy. A spirit named Hongo, by chance, encases the entire island in a storybook to keep Bowser and his army at bay.

In Yoshi Touch & Go, Yoshi must help Baby Mario in safely floating down to the forest at the start of each mode. They can use the stylus to block opponents or move Baby Mario about, as well as to form coin bubbles around non-spiked enemies and to add coins to Baby Mario.

Kamek and Bowser travel back in time in Yoshi's Island DS to try to capture the famous star children (Mario, Luigi, Wario, and Donkey Kong), who had special energy in their bodies that, once in Bowser's hands, would let him to take over the world. Without knowing who the star children were, Kamek and Bowser went out to kidnap all of the Mushroom Kingdom's youngsters, only to have their prey escape their hands and join Yoshi in a journey to save the other kids.

In Yoshi's New Island, Yoshi reappears alongside Baby Mario and Baby Luigi. The game takes place between Super Mario World 2: Yoshi's Island and Super Mario World 2: Yoshi's Island DS.

In Yoshi's Woolly World, Kamek tries to transform all of the Yoshis on Craft Island into Wonder Wools in order to assist Baby Bowser in building a new castle, but he misses Yoshi and Red Yoshi. After that, the two embarked on a quest to restore Craft Island to its former splendor.

Yoshi and the rest of his kind are gathered around the Sundream Stone in Yoshi's Crafted World, which is claimed to make anyone's dream come true. Kamek and Baby Bowser try to get their hands on the stone. The Sundream Stone breaks into five diamonds, which spread around the island for the Yoshis to collect.

Other Super Mario games 
Yoshi has appeared in nearly all of the Mario spin-off games, including every game in the Mario Kart series as a playable character (usually as a middleweight or light middleweight) and every Mario Party game to date as a playable character. Yoshis have also made appearances in multiple Mario sports games, such as Mario Tennis, Mario Golf, Mario Super Sluggers, Super Mario Strikers, and Mario & Sonic at the Olympic Games.

Yoshi appeared as a supporting cast member in Mario is Missing for NES, SNES, and MS-DOS in 1993.

The Yoshi species makes its Paper Mario series debut in the fifth chapter of Paper Mario when Mario comes across a village of Yoshis and rescues a group of Yoshi kids after they become lost in the surrounding jungle outside of the village. In the sequel Paper Mario: The Thousand-Year Door Mario rescues a Yoshi egg that hatches into a baby Yoshi, who then joins his team during the third chapter of the game and can be named upon doing so. He also appears in Mario & Luigi: Partners in Time.

Yoshi is a playable character in Mario + Rabbids Kingdom Battle, and he arrives late in the story. After fighting Mecha Jr. in the Lava Pit, he is unlocked. He also returns as a playable character in the sequel Mario + Rabbids Sparks of Hope.

In other media 
Outside of Super Mario and Yoshi series. Yoshi makes a cameo appearance in Metal Gear (The Twin Snakes and Metal Gear Solid: Snake Eater 3D). In Metal Gear Solid: The Twin Snakes, Yoshi and Mario appears as a dolls that stand on a desk. Additional video game series in which Yoshi has made a cameo appearance includes The Legend of Zelda series (Link's Awakening and Ocarina of Time) as a collectible doll and as a framed photo in Hyrule Castle.

Yoshi is the main character in the English localization of Tetris Attack. Yoshi also appears as a playable character in every installment of the Super Smash Bros. series. He is one of the more unique characters in the series' early history, most notably in how his recovery is a single interruption-resistant Flutter Jump, as opposed to most characters having multiple jumps and special moves to use in sequence. Yoshi's moveset mostly consists of kicks, headbutts, tail attacks, and tongue grabs.

The animated series Super Mario World produced by DIC Entertainment is based on the game of the same name, and similar in plotline to the previous series The Adventures of Super Mario Bros. 3, and The Super Mario Bros. Super Show, except with a different setting. The show features Yoshi as a regular character, voiced by Andrew Sabiston. In the cartoon, Yoshi is a young, friendly, and fleet-of-foot dinosaur who occasionally talks in 3rd person until speaking coherent English from slightly later in the episode "A Little Learning".

Yoshi is featured in the Super Mario Adventures comic serial printed in Nintendo Power, the Nintendo Adventure Books, and the 1993 Super Mario Bros. movie (taking the form of a realistic animatronic dinosaur). Yoshi is King Koopa's pet, and is referred to as a "throwback" by a gang of Koopas. He later joins Princess Daisy's side and selflessly takes a stabbing for her.  However, he does reappear at the end of the film in good health. Yoshi first debuts in the first volume of Super Mario-Kun and has since become a frequent companion to Mario. Yoshi is prone to making surprising behaviors and mistakes, prompting Mario to chastise him. Yoshi abandons Mario, Luigi, and Wario in volume 23 when they take advantage of him.

Yoshi is also prominently featured within Universal Destinations & Experiences' immersive Super Nintendo World areas. Yoshi appears within the Mario Kart: Bowser's Challenge attraction, and the Universal Studios Japan iteration of the land features a Yoshi's Adventure attraction that is themed to the Yoshi's Island series.

Promotion and reception 
Yoshi is one of the most recognizable characters in the Mario series and is featured in a myriad of Mario merchandise, such as toys, shirts, and figures. Yoshi also appeared in two of Happy Meal promotions of Mario toys, which only featured Mario, Donkey Kong, and Yoshi. Yoshi was also one of the 12 initial amiibo figurines. As part of the release of Yoshi's Woolly World, Yoshi Amiibo made out of yarn are either bundled with the game or sold separately. In addition to the regular-sized green, pink and light blue yarn Yoshi Amiibo, an 8-inch tall, green "Mega Yarn Yoshi" has been released.

Since debuting in Super Mario World, Yoshi has received largely positive reception. An article in Electronic Gaming Monthly commented, "Maybe it was the undeniable dino charm. Maybe it was the insatiable appetite that put fellow foe-eater Kirby to shame. Or maybe it was the status of being Mario's newest best buddy. Whatever the reason, gamers took an immediate liking to Yoshi and his multicolored kin when Super Mario World hatched him into the pantheon of classic game characters." The 2011 issue of the Guinness World Records Gamer's Edition ranked Yoshi at 21st place in their list of the "Top 50 Video Game Characters of All Time", making him the second highest-ranked Mario character on the list, of which Mario himself is ranked first. In a poll conducted in 2008, Yoshi was voted as the third-favorite video game character in Japan, with Cloud Strife and Mario placing second and first, respectively. GameTrailers created a special tribute video for Yoshi for the release of Super Mario Galaxy 2. Yardbarker included Yoshi in their "The most memorable characters from old school Nintendo games", stating that "Yoshi began life in Super Mario World. However, the dinosaur with the lengthy tongue was swiftly spun off into his own video games. There’s Yoshi’s Island, Yoshi’s Cookie, and more. Yoshi is off doing his own thing a lot of the time." Chris Carter of Destructoid described Yoshi, along with Poochy, as "cute as hell" in the "Poochy & Yoshi’s Woolly World" promotion. Yoshi was voted one of the finest dinosaurs of pop culture by Jim Vorel of Paste, he said that "Yoshi has been a fan favorite since he first appeared alongside Mario on the Super Nintendo Entertainment System. That's why he's the most famous dinosaur in the world."

Yoshi was also praised for being the best video game sidekick. GameSpy ranked Yoshi as the seventh-best video game sidekick, above Luigi by reasoning that only Yoshi can pull off being green and still be cool. Complex ranked Yoshi at fourth place among "The 25 Most Kickass Dragons in Video Games", adding "Yoshi would have to be one of the best sidekicks of all time". Australia's Official Nintendo Magazine called Yoshi a "cute, trustworthy, a plumber's best friend" and compared Yoshi's loyalty to that of a dog. Yoshi is ranked at 52nd place on GamesRadars Top 100 video game heroes. 4,228 gamers from all over the world were asked to choose their favorite "most loved sidekick characters in video games." Yoshi from Super Mario World came in top place and was voted the most popular sidekick character with 71 percent of the voting. Yoshi was included in IGNs "The Best Video Game Wingmen Ever", stating that "Always ready to give his plumber friend a ride, Yoshi doesn't shy away from putting in extra effort, whether that means holding a Koopa shell in his mouth for an entire level or kicking his feet to get a little extra air during a jump, Yoshi has Mario's back." Yoshi has been named one of the best-supporting characters in video games by Kevin Wong of Complex, stating that "Yoshi has everything Mario and Luigi need in a sidekick – a monstrous appetite, boots that can walk on Munchers, and the ability to breathe fire, fly, and cause earthquakes, depending on the Koopa shell's color. You have to love a sidekick that hatches with a built-in saddle." Yoshi was also included as 4th in Complexs "The 25 Most Kickass Dragons in Video Games". While Alyssa Mercante of GamesRadar also included Yoshi in their list of "The ten best video game animal companions," she stated that "Yoshi is another companion that has achieved a level of fame virtually unrivaled by video game sidekicks." "Yoshi Committed Tax Fraud", an internet meme that began in May 2018, is a reference to jokes about Yoshi dodging taxes.

Notes

References

Sources
  Text was copied from Yoshi at Super Mario Wiki, which is released under a Creative Commons Attribution-Share Alike 3.0 (Unported) (CC-BY-SA 3.0) license.

External links 
 Yoshi at Play Nintendo
 MarioWiki entry

Animal characters in video games
Anthropomorphic video game characters
Anthropomorphic dinosaurs
Fantasy film characters
Internet memes
Mario (franchise) characters
Nintendo protagonists
Super Smash Bros. fighters
Video game characters introduced in 1990
Video game sidekicks
Video game species and races